Adiós pueblo de Ayacucho is a popular traditional Peruvian huayno from Ayacucho.

Like many traditional songs, there is a wide variation in the lyrics.  Most use some variation of this core verse:

Adiós pueblo de Ayacucho, perlas challay
Donde he padecido tanto, perlas challay
Adiós pueblo de Ayacucho, perlas challay
Ciertas malas voluntades, perlas challay

Each line is generally terminated with the internal refrain "perlas challay".

The song has been widely recorded, including notable versions by Inkhay, Los Incas, Los Heraldos, Jaime Guardia and Raúl García.

Andean music
Peruvian folk music
Year of song unknown
Songwriter unknown